The Crossroads (Spanish: La Encrucijada) is a 1952 Argentine film.

Cast
 Mario Danesi		
 José Guisone		
 Gina Maria Hidalgo		
 Juan Latrónico		
 Claudio Lucero		
 Diego Marcote	 ...	Preso
 Mario Pocoví		
  Lydia Quintana		
 Alberto Rinaldi		
 Ricardo Trigo

External links

References

1952 films
1950s Spanish-language films
Argentine black-and-white films
1950s Argentine films
Films directed by Leopoldo Torres Ríos